Marshal of the German Democratic Republic, was the highest rank in the National People's Army of the former German Democratic Republic (GDR). It was never held and was abolished in 1989.

History 
The  could promote a general to this rank for exceptional military achievement. The rank was an imitation of the supreme Soviet rank, that of Marshal of the Soviet Union.

Some believe that this rank would only have been granted in wartime and was created as a result of changes in Warsaw Pact military planning. Prior to this change all East German forces were under the direct control of the Soviet military command.

In November 1989, the acting Minister for National Defense, Admiral Theodor Hoffmann, abolished this rank.

Design 
Several designs were considered for the Marshal shoulder board. The final design was a shoulder board 118 mm long and 48 mm wide consisting of interlaced gold and silver cord backed by a red cloth material on which was placed a five-pointed, gilded star with a red ruby in the center. According to Klaus Wather's , 12 pairs of these shoulder boards were made.

Drawings were also made of a Soviet-style "Marshal's star" to be worn on a red neck ribbon but this item was never produced.

Also planned were Marshal rank insignia for the new field uniform.  This consisted of a 90 x 60 mm rectangular badge of stone-grey cloth for mounting on the upper uniform sleeve. On this badge was woven a large five-pointed gold colored star with a red center over a 20 mm long horizontal gold bar.  For the cap there was an oval badge 50 × 30 mm with the same design as the sleeve insignia.

See also 
 Military ranks of East Germany
 Corps colours (NPA)

References 
 Klaus H. Feder: Marschall der DDR – ein Dienstgrad, den keiner erreichte. Militaria, 5/2002 
 Klaus Wather: Uniformeffekten der bewaffneten Organe der DDR Band II. Ecotour, 1994

Military ranks of Germany
Military of East Germany
1982 establishments in East Germany
1989 disestablishments in East Germany